The equirectangular projection (also called the equidistant cylindrical projection or la carte parallélogrammatique projection), and which includes the special case of the plate carrée projection (also called the geographic projection, lat/lon projection, or plane chart), is a simple map projection attributed to Marinus of Tyre, who Ptolemy claims invented the projection about AD 100. 

The projection maps meridians to vertical straight lines of constant spacing (for meridional intervals of constant spacing), and circles of latitude to horizontal straight lines of constant spacing (for constant intervals of parallels). The projection is neither equal area nor conformal. Because of the distortions introduced by this projection, it has little use in navigation or cadastral mapping and finds its main use in thematic mapping. In particular, the plate carrée has become a standard for global raster datasets, such as Celestia, NASA World Wind, the USGS Astrogeology Research Program, and Natural Earth, because of the particularly simple relationship between the position of an image pixel on the map and its corresponding geographic location on Earth or other spherical solar system bodies. In addition it is frequently used in panoramic photography to represent a spherical panoramic image.

Definition
The forward projection transforms spherical coordinates into planar coordinates. The reverse projection transforms from the plane back onto the sphere. The formulae presume a spherical model and use these definitions:
 is the longitude of the location to project;
 is the latitude of the location to project;
 are the standard parallels (north and south of the equator) where the scale of the projection is true;
 is the central parallel of the map;
 is the central meridian of the map;
 is the horizontal coordinate of the projected location on the map;
 is the vertical coordinate of the projected location on the map;
 is the radius of the globe.
Longitude and latitude variables are defined here in terms of radians.

Forward

The  (French, for flat square), is the special case where  is zero. This projection maps x to be the value of the longitude and y to be the value of the latitude, and therefore is sometimes called the latitude/longitude or lat/lon(g) projection. Despite sometimes being called "unprojected", it is actually projected.

While a projection with equally spaced parallels is possible for an ellipsoidal model, it would no longer be equidistant because the distance between parallels on an ellipsoid is not constant. More complex formulae can be used to create an equidistant map whose parallels reflect the true spacing.

Reverse

Alternative names
In spherical panorama viewers, usually:

 is called "yaw";
 is called "pitch";

where both are defined in degrees.

See also
Cartography
Cassini projection
Gall–Peters projection with resolution regarding the use of rectangular world maps
List of map projections
Mercator projection
360 video projection

References

External links
 Global MODIS based satellite map The blue marble: land surface, ocean color, and sea ice.
 Table of examples and properties of all common projections, from radicalcartography.net.
 Panoramic Equirectangular Projection, PanoTools wiki.
 Equidistant Cylindrical (Plate Carrée) in proj4

Map projections
Equidistant projections
Cylindrical projections